Javante McCoy (born January 24, 1998) is an American professional basketball player for the South Bay Lakers of the NBA G League. He played college basketball at Boston University.

High school career
McCoy played high school basketball for the Big Red at Phillips Exeter Academy in Exeter, New Hampshire.

College career
McCoy played at Boston University for five seasons. He averaged 12.2 points and 2.7 rebounds per game as a junior. As a senior, McCoy averaged 16.1 points per game, earning Second Team All-Patriot League honors. In his fifth season, he averaged 17.4 points, 3.9 rebounds and 2.9 assists per game. He was named to the First Team All-Patriot League.

Professional career

South Bay Lakers (2022–present)
Undrafted in the 2022 NBA draft, McCoy played for the Los Angeles Lakers in the 2022 NBA Summer League. On July 24, 2022, he signed with the Lakers. On October 8, he was waived by the Lakers. On November 3, 2022, McCoy was named to the opening night roster for the South Bay Lakers.

Career statistics

College

|-
| style="text-align:left;"|2017–18
| style="text-align:left;"|Boston University
| 31 || 27 || 25.6 || .444 || .435 || .648 || 2.6 || 1.7 || .9 || .2 || 8.9
|- 
| style="text-align:left;"|2018–19
| style="text-align:left;"|Boston University
| 32 || 30 || 29.6 || .429 || .386 || .806 || 3.1 || 2.3 || 1.0 || .2 || 12.1
|- 
| style="text-align:left;"|2019–20
| style="text-align:left;"|Boston University
| 33 || 31 || 30.6 || .413 || .279 || .735 || 2.7 || 3.4 || .7 || .2 || 12.2
|- 
| style="text-align:left;"|2020–21
| style="text-align:left;"|Boston University
| 16 || 15 || 31.2 || .485 || .313 || .785 || 4.6 || 2.2 || .8 || .3 || 16.1
|- 
| style="text-align:left;"|2021–22
| style="text-align:left;"|Boston University
| 35 || 35 || 34.0 || .495 || .425 || .708 || 3.9 || 2.9 || 1.1 || .2 || 17.4
|- class="sortbottom"
| style="text-align:center;" colspan="2"|Career
| 147 || 138 || 30.2 || .454 || .377 || .738 || 3.3 || 2.6 || .9 || .2 || 13.1

References

External links
 Boston University Terriers bio

1998 births
Living people
American men's basketball players
Basketball players from Milwaukee
Boston University Terriers men's basketball players
Guards (basketball)